Queensland Kanaka English, Queensland Canefields English or Queensland Plantation Pidgin English is an English-based pidgin language that was spoken by Melanesian labourers in Queensland, Australia from the late 1860s.

See also
Blackbirding
Kanakas

References

Sources

English-based pidgins and creoles of Australia
Languages attested from the 1860s
Culture of Queensland
History of Queensland